Damak (Nepali: दमक), a city in eastern Nepal is one of the oldest municipalities in Jhapa District in Koshi Pradesh in eastern Nepal. It is situated between the Ratuwa River in the east and the Maawa River in the west. It has Sivalik Hills in its north and ends with the intersection of Ratuwa River and Maawa River in the south. Mahendra Highway  (longest highway of Nepal) crosses this municipality nearly bisecting it.  It is the third largest city in Jhapa District with a population of 107,410 in 2021 A.D

Demography
The ethnicity and caste pattern of the municipality shows diversity with major ethnic
groups as Brahmin (33.09 percent), Chhetri (23.62 percent), Dhimal (6.53 percent), Limbu
(6.5 percent), Newar (6.14 percent) and Rai (5.77 percent). Besides these ethnic groups
other various ethnic groups comprise small proportions of the population such as Kaami
(2.88 percent),
Tamang (2.51
percent) Damai/Dholi
(2.35 percent). The
remaining other
ethnic and caste
groups like Teli,
Gharti/Bhujel, Magar,
Sarki, Gurung,
Muslim, etc.
comprises about 10
percent of the total
population.
Damak is one of the oldest city from the whole district and it was the safest place during the Maoist insurgency.

Damak is one of the oldest municipalities in the Eastern Nepal. It is home to many ex-Gurkha who served in the Nepali, Indian and British Military.

Landscape information

Damak was changed to a municipality from a VDC (Village Development Committee) in 1981 AD. The Damak municipality consists of 10 wards, with the previous 19 wards rearranged and some wards are merged. Damak includes the large Himalayan tea estate (हिमालय गूडरिक) where the former royal family has invested and a palace was built for the ex King and Queen where palace also build for stay of Royal families. The municipality covers an area of 7,513 hectares and is at an average of 100 meters above sea level. Lakhanpur is to the east, Urlabari, Rajghat and Madhumalla is in the west and Chulachuli (Ilam) and Kohabhara VDC in the north and the south, respectively.

According to the census of 2011, Damak had 7,178 households containing about 36,000 people. The total area is 7,513 hectares out of which 1406.7 hectares is covered by residential area whereas 5,586.30 hectares is used for agriculture. The market area consists of 400.00 hectares, 215 hectares as forest plant area and 265.00 hectares is used in other purposes.

It is the biggest city in Province No. 1. Pashuhat, located in Damak-7, is known as the biggest cattle market in the eastern Nepal.

Health and services

In 056/057 there was 1 Health post, 1 Hospital (AMDA) and 1 Nursing Home (Life Line) which contains 100 beds in total but now including AMDA and life line: there are 7 hospital they are AMDA-Nepal, Advance Health Care Centre, life line, om mechi, Q&Q hospital, Namaste Public Hospital, Janta National Hospital, damak hospital & research center. The Population Growth Rate is 5.14 per annum as per 2047/48 census. As per 056/057 census, there were about 88 industries, 1011 shops, 244 hotels and 9 financial institutions. Black topped road were 29 km, graveled roads were 150 km and earthen road were 500 km. In addition to it, the drainage runs 3.5  km through the main highway. There are 512 street lights and above 4000 telephone lines to the public. Three Bhutanese Refugees camps (Beldangi 1, 2, and 3) were also settled in Damak in 1992. Victoria Cross Medal winner Rambahadur Limbu currently lives in Damak.

It is one of the important trade centers in the eastern part of Nepal. There are many international organizations such as IOM, UNHCR, OXFAM, LWF, NRCS, AMDA, CARITAS NEPAL, etc. who are working for the refugees here in Damak.

Education

According to 2001 Nepal census, literacy rate of the city is 88%.

School Data
Primary1038
Lower Secondary700
Secondary1408
Technical School Under CTEVT490
Higher Secondary1500
Affiliated Campus9

Communication and Entertainment

Nepal Telecom Damak Branch serves as the center for Telecommunication and Cellular with two huge Skyline Towers. Whereas Axiatas's Ncell is also popular in the city having 82 small and One huge tower installed for the fastest connectivity. There are 3 cellular providers in Damak; Ncell, NTC and Smart Cell. Here, all 3 cellular providers delivers 4G services in Damak.

Worldlink Communication, Subisu, Vianet, Firstlink, Unified Communication and Classictech are Internet Service Provider (ISP) which are providing internet services in Damak.

Damak has five FM stations named Pathibhara FM (93.6 MHz), Saptarangi FM (101.6 MHz), Radio Himshikhar (103.3Mhz), Star FM (92Mhz), Radio Jhapa (100.7Mhz), and Radio Kings FM (104.1Mhz). But national radio station Radio Nepal and other surrounding FM stations Kanchanjungha FM, Saptakoshi FM, Koshi FM, Kantipur FM can clearly be heard in the city. Damak is also broadcasting the television channel named Himshikhar Television from a couple of years and running successfully in the nationwide. There used to be two TV DTH providers named National cable and another Kankai cable( which later merged with National cable and started its services with the name Jagriti National Cable and later named as Doen TV (2017) and Mero TV (2019)) in Damak. SIM TV are also started to provide the DTH services, and later Dish Home also started a services in Damak.

There are 2 single movie hall named Pathibhara Chalchitra Mandir and Damak Chalchitra Mandir and DMAX Cinema is multiplex where movies can be watched.

References

External links

Populated places in Jhapa District
Municipalities in Koshi Province
Nepal municipalities established in 1982
Municipalities in Jhapa District